Niagara Gorge is an  long canyon carved by the Niagara River along the Canada–United States border, between the U.S. state of New York and the Canadian province of Ontario. It begins at the base of Niagara Falls and ends downriver at the edge of the geological formation known as the Niagara Escarpment near Queenston, Ontario, where the falls originated about 12,500 years ago. The position of the falls has receded upstream toward Lake Erie because of the falling waters' slow erosion of the riverbed's hard Lockport dolomite (a form of limestone that is the surface rock of the escarpment), combined with rapid erosion of the relatively soft layers beneath it.  This erosion has created the gorge.

The force of the river current in the gorge is one of the most powerful in the world; because of the dangers this presents, kayaking the gorge has generally been prohibited. On multiple occasions, the rapids of the gorge have claimed the lives of people attempting to run them. However, on isolated occasions, world-class experts have been permitted to navigate the stretch. Tourists can traverse the rapids of the Niagara Gorge on commercial tours in rugged jetboats, which are based at Niagara-on-the-Lake, Ontario, at Lewiston, New York, at Youngstown, New York, and in midsummer at Niagara Glen Nature Centre on the Niagara Parkway in Ontario.

In popular culture
The 1980 movie Superman II includes a scene in the gorge, where Lois Lane tries to force Clark Kent to reveal that he is Superman by "accidentally" falling in the river so he will have to save her.

See also

Niagara Whirlpool
Whirlpool Rapids Incline

References

Niagara River
Canada–United States border
Canyons and gorges of North America
Landforms of the Regional Municipality of Niagara
Canyons and gorges of Ontario
Landforms of Niagara County, New York
Canyons and gorges of New York (state)